Jeff Probst (born November 4, 1961) is an American television presenter and producer. He is best known as the Emmy Award-winning host of the U.S. version of the reality television show Survivor since 2000. He was also the host of The Jeff Probst Show, a syndicated daytime talk show produced by CBS Television Distribution from September 2012 to May 2013.

Early life
Probst was born at Wesley Medical Center in Wichita, Kansas, to Jerry and Barbara Probst, and moved to Bellevue, Washington halfway through high school. After graduating from Newport High School in 1979, he attended Seattle Pacific University and worked at Boeing Motion Picture/Television studio as a producer and narrator of marketing videos.

Career

In addition to Survivor, Probst once hosted FX's original half-hour show dedicated to answering viewer letters, Backchat, along with Sound FX, a music series featuring Orlando Jones (1996). Probst also hosted the VH1 series Rock & Roll Jeopardy! from 1998 to 2001, and was a correspondent for the syndicated program Access Hollywood. He also wrote and directed the Lionsgate released film, Finder's Fee. People magazine named Probst one of the "50 Most Beautiful People" in 2001. He often contributes to Jeopardy! by giving Survivor related clues from the show's venues, has twice appeared on Celebrity Jeopardy!, first in 2001 and again in 2003, and made several cameo appearances during the April 1, 2010 episode.

He was a frequent guest star on the sketch show MADtv, guest-starring once a season since the show's 9th season. He hosted "Celebrity Superfan Roundtable" for Howard Stern. He is the host of Survivor, a globally-syndicated American reality show which he has hosted since its inception in 2000. He has stated that he had worked hard to get a meeting with series creator Mark Burnett as he believed the show was "something special".  He delivers the series' signature catch-phrase to losing contestants, "The tribe has spoken. It's time for you to go", which was included in TV Land's "The 100 Greatest TV Quotes and Catch Phrases" special in 2006. Probst made a guest appearance in a 2003 episode of Space Ghost Coast to Coast on Cartoon Network's Adult Swim.

On October 20, 2008, TV Guide reported that Probst was developing a new reality TV series for CBS called Live For The Moment that was to feature people with terminal illnesses being taken on "the last adventure of their life" before they die. Only the pilot was aired, on January 28, 2010.

On April 1, 2009, Probst appeared on the CBS reality television special I Get That a Lot, in which he worked a cash register.

In October 2011, he appeared as himself on the sitcom How I Met Your Mother, in the episode "The Stinson Missile Crisis".

In January 2012, Probst was announced as director of his second feature film, coming-of-age story Kiss Me, starring John Corbett and Sarah Bolger, with production scheduled to begin in Los Angeles, California, the following month.

From September 10, 2012, Probst hosted  The Jeff Probst Show, a syndicated daytime talk show produced by CBS Television Distribution from September 2012 to May 2013. CBS did not pick up the show for a second season, citing low ratings. Starting in October 2012, Probst has hosted the recurring Adult Swim special, "The Greatest Event in Television History", which consists of remakes of 1980s TV show title sequences.

In February 2013, Probst teamed up with Christopher Tebbetts to release the first of Scholastic's adventure series Stranded, aimed at middle school students, grades 4–6. It follows the story of Vanessa, Buzz, Carter, and Jane as they are left on a deserted island and forced to fend for themselves. It started out as a regular vacation but when a storm sets in, the kids are shipwrecked in the middle of the South Pacific without any parents. They must find a way to work together if they are ever to get off the island. Stranded is the first of the three-book series.

In November 2013 and January 2014, Probst appeared as himself on the sitcom Two and a Half Men in two season 11 episodes, "Some Kind of Lesbian Zombie" and "Baseball. Boobs. Boobs. Baseball.".

In December 2016, Probst appeared as himself on the sitcom Life in Pieces, in the episode "Swim Survivor Zen Talk".

Personal life
Probst was married to his first wife, psychotherapist Shelley Wright, from 1996 to 2001. In 2004, after filming on Survivor: Vanuatu wrapped, he began dating one of the contestants, Julie Berry. They broke up in early 2008. Probst married his second spouse, Lisa Ann Russell, on December 5, 2011. Through this marriage, Probst is a stepfather to Russell's two children, son Michael (born in 2004) and daughter Ava (born in 2006), from her former marriage to actor Mark-Paul Gosselaar. Probst has stated that he and his partner amicably share custody with Gosselaar and his second partner, and that the children consider all four to be parents.

Probst keeps the snuffer that he uses to snuff the torches when a contestant is voted out of the game as a souvenir after every season of Survivor.
He has written a book called Stranded, based on the show Survivor. As an ordained minister, he has presided over the weddings of several of his friends.

Awards
On September 21, 2008, Probst won the first Primetime Emmy Award for Outstanding Host for a Reality or Reality-Competition Program. He won the same award in 2009, 2010, and 2011.  The Los Angeles Times attributed Probst's undefeated track record in the category to his penchant for interacting with contestants on a compassionate personal level unseen in any of his competitors, transcending his role of host to that of counselor.

Filmography

References

External links

 
 
 CBS.com profile
 

1961 births
Alumni of Le Cordon Bleu
American game show hosts
American people of German descent
American television talk show hosts
Living people
People from Bellevue, Washington
Businesspeople from Seattle
People from Wichita, Kansas
Primetime Emmy Award winners
Seattle Pacific University alumni
Film directors from Washington (state)
Film directors from Kansas
Survivor (American TV series)